The following is a list of documentary podcasts.

List

References 

documentary
Documentary podcasts